Carlos de Oliveira Nascimento (3 January 1904 — 24 February 1979) was a Brazilian football player and manager who played as a midfielder. He coached the Brazil national team in 1939 for the Copa Roca.  He was born and died in Rio de Janeiro.

References 

1904 births
1979 deaths
Brazilian footballers
Association football midfielders
Brazil international footballers
Brazilian football managers
Brazil national football team managers
Footballers from Rio de Janeiro (city)